The 2008–09 Indonesia Super League U-21 season will be the first edition of Indonesia Super League U-21 (ISL U-21), a companion competition Indonesian super league that are intended for footballers under the age of twenty-one years.

Djarum, an Indonesian tobacco company will continue its participation as the competition's main sponsor.

Format 
The competition is divided into three acts consist of two round the group and knockout round. The first round is divided into three groups each containing six clubs, two top teams of each group advanced to the second round. The second half consisted of two groups containing three teams in each group intended, the two best teams from each group advanced to the semifinals. The winner advanced to the final semi-final, while two teams who defeated third-ranked fight. Final winner becomes the champion.

Current Clubs

Top scorer

Winner
Pelita Jaya U-21

Awards

External links
 Indonesia Super League standings (including U-21 ISL)

 
Indonesia Super League U-21 seasons
U